Kristen Anderson-Lopez (born March 21, 1972) is an American songwriter and lyricist known for co-writing the songs for the 2013 computer-animated musical film Frozen and its 2019 sequel Frozen II with her husband Robert Lopez. The couple won the Academy Award for Best Original Song for "Let It Go" from Frozen and "Remember Me" from Coco (2017) at the 86th and 90th awards respectively. She also won two Grammy Awards at the 57th Annual Grammy Awards.

Personal life
Anderson-Lopez was raised in Croton-on-Hudson, New York (a suburb of New York City), until 1986; the Myers Park neighborhood of Charlotte, North Carolina, from 1986 to 1990; and Waxhaw, North Carolina (a suburb of Charlotte), from 1990 onward (which was her home during her college years). Her parents, Erin and John, still live in Waxhaw. According to her father, Anderson-Lopez first fell in love with the theater at the age of four, when he took her to see a U.S. Bicentennial musical tribute staged in their then-hometown of Croton-on-Hudson. After her family moved to North Carolina, she attended and graduated from Charlotte Country Day School. She went on to Williams College in western Massachusetts, where she double-majored in drama and psychology and graduated in 1994. After a theater internship in Florida, Anderson-Lopez spent several years working temporary jobs while pursuing her dream of becoming a Broadway theatre performer in New York City. In 1999, she entered the BMI Lehman Engel Musical Theatre Workshop and found her true calling as a lyricist, and also met her future husband Robert Lopez.

In October 2003, Anderson married Lopez, who would go on to become an EGOT-winning songwriter, composer and lyricist, including three Tony Awards for Avenue Q and The Book of Mormon. They have two daughters; Katie and Annie, who both had voice parts in Frozen.

Anderson-Lopez's sister, Kate Anderson, co-wrote the songs for Olaf's Frozen Adventure.

Stage productions
In 2006, Anderson-Lopez and her husband wrote the songs for the Walt Disney World production of Finding Nemo – The Musical.

Anderson-Lopez is the co-creator of the musical In Transit, developed at the O'Neill Musical Theatre Conference. The musical ran Off-Broadway at the 59E59 Theatre, from September 21, 2010, to October 30, 2010. The production received the 2011 Drama Desk Award for Outstanding Ensemble, as well as a nomination for the 2011 Lucille Lortel Award, Outstanding Musical (among others) and the 2011 Outer Critics Circle Award for Outstanding New Off-Broadway Musical. It opened on Broadway at the Circle in the Square Theatre in November 2016, directed and choreographed by Kathleen Marshall.

She co-created the romantic stage musical Up Here, which debuted in 2015, with her husband and Alex Timbers.

Her work for young audiences includes numerous short and full-length musical adaptations for Theatreworks USA (Diary of a Worm, Fancy Nancy, Condensed Classics).

Anderson-Lopez worked with her husband on the Disney Theatrical Productions stage musical adaptation of Frozen, with Jennifer Lee writing the book.

Film and television productions 
Anderson-Lopez's first collaborations with her husband involved writing several songs together for children's televisions shows, such as Wonder Pets on Nick Jr and Bear in the Big Blue House on the Disney Channel.

Anderson-Lopez, along with her husband Robert Lopez and Henry Jackman, wrote and produced music for the 2011 Disney film Winnie the Pooh, for which they were nominated for an Annie Award for Best Music in a Feature Production. She also provided the voice of Kanga in the film.

Her work with her husband writing songs for the 2013 Disney film Frozen, including "Let It Go", won her an Academy Award for Best Original Song at the 86th Academy Awards and two Grammy Awards at the 57th Annual Grammy Awards. Anderson-Lopez and her husband also wrote the music for the sequel, Frozen II.

Kristen Anderson-Lopez and Robert Lopez again collaborated in writing songs and lyrics for the 2017 Pixar film Coco, for which she won for an Annie Award for Music in a Feature Production. She also won an Academy Award for Best Original Song for the song "Remember Me" at the 90th Academy Awards.

Kristen Anderson-Lopez sings Elsa’s part in “I Seek the Truth”, an outtake song of the Frozen II soundtrack, along with Patti Murin singing Anna’s part. Murin had originated the role of Anna in the Broadway production of Frozen.

Anderson-Lopez and her husband wrote and produced music for the 2021 series WandaVision, set in the Marvel Cinematic Universe. The series features multiple title theme songs based on various classic American sitcoms, as well as the song "Agatha All Along".

Awards and nominations

Academy Awards

Annie Awards

Children's and Family Emmy Awards

Critics' Choice Movie Awards

Golden Globe Awards

Grammy Awards

Primetime Emmy Awards

Tony Awards

References

External links
 

Actresses from Charlotte, North Carolina
American women songwriters 
American musical theatre composers
Women musical theatre composers
American musical theatre lyricists
Songwriters from New York (state)
Annie Award winners
Best Original Song Academy Award-winning songwriters
Broadway composers and lyricists
Grammy Award winners
People from Croton-on-Hudson, New York
Primetime Emmy Award winners
Living people
Walt Disney Animation Studios people
Williams College alumni
Charlotte Country Day School alumni
1972 births
People from Waxhaw, North Carolina
Animation composers
21st-century American women musicians